1993–94 Vyshcha Liha was the third season of the Vyshcha Liha.

Last season the league champions Dynamo received a fierce competition from the Pavlov led Dnipro out of Dnipropetrovsk. The third season was promising to be even more exciting. Dynamo was going through some difficult times and before the start of the season, it was sold to Hryhoriy Surkis from Viktor Bezverkhyi.

The season started on August 8 with nine games of the first round. It finally was concluded on June 19. It was anticipated that at least four clubs would be really competing for the top title. At the end it turned out the other way around. Dnipro has remarkably given up its positions, losing almost ten games. Chornomorets also did not pose any resistance to neither Dynamo or Shakhtar. However, the biggest surprise was the relegation of Metalist Kharkiv which won only six games. Metalurh Zaporizhzhia barely escaped relegation, partially due to their excellent game in Kharkiv where they manage to thrash the local Metalist 3:0. Three rounds before the end Dynamo was recognized as the champions. There was one technical loss (-:+) that was awarded again to SC Tavriya Simferopol when it was hosting FC Volyn Lutsk in the 32nd round on June 11, 1994, for fielding a suspended player Dzyubenko.

Preseason changes
The league was expanded to 18 teams including the same 16 from the past season.

Teams

Promotions
Nyva Vinnytsia, the champion of the 1992–93 Ukrainian First League  – (returning after a season absence)
Temp Shepetivka, the runner-up of the 1992–93 Ukrainian First League  – (returning after a season absence)

Location

Notes:

Managers

League table

 Dynamo Kyiv won its second title at home against Metalist Kharkiv on June 7, 1994, earning its 20th win of the season at the Republican Stadium in Kyiv in front of 3,500 spectators.

Results

Top goalscorers

Medal squads
(league appearances and goals listed in brackets)

Note: Players in italic are whose playing position is uncertain.

See also
 1993–94 Ukrainian First League
 1993–94 Ukrainian Second League
 1993–94 Ukrainian Third League
 1993–94 Ukrainian Cup

References

External links
Season information on the Ukrainian Football from Dmytro Troshchiy
Season information on RSSSF
Season information on the Ukrainian Football from Aleksei Kobyzev

Ukrainian Premier League seasons
1993–94 in Ukrainian association football leagues
Ukra